José Antonio Pecharromán Fabián (born 16 June 1978 in Cáceres) is a Spanish former professional road bicycle racer.

Major results

1999
1st Stage 3a Vuelta a Alava
National Under-23 Road Championships
3rd Time trial
9th Road race
2003
1st  Overall Volta a Catalunya
1st Stage 6
1st  Overall Euskal Bizikleta
1st Stages 2, 3 & 4b (ITT)
2005
2nd Trofeo Calvià
6th Overall Tour of Belgium
2006
5th Subida Urkiola
2007
8th Overall Volta a Portugal

External links

Spanish male cyclists
1978 births
Living people
People from Cáceres, Spain
Sportspeople from the Province of Cáceres
Cyclists from Extremadura